Semlex Group, founded in 1992, produces documents and devices for secure identification and offers corresponding services. It is owned and operated by Syrian-Belgian businessman Albert Karaziwan.

It prints the passports of several African and Asian countries, including Azerbaijan, Comoros, Democratic Republic of Congo, Guinea-Bissau, Madagascar and Moldova. It has been accused of regularly using bribery and kickbacks to secure business.

In 2019, Semlex was awarded the contract to produce national identity cards in Côte d'Ivoire. Semlex reports financing projects in the field of education, notably in the Comoros and Côte d'Ivoire.

References 

Printing companies of Belgium
Publishing companies established in 1992